Yoennis Hernández Arruez (born 1 February 1978) is a Cuban former rower who competed at three Summer Olympics.

Biography
Born in Guantánamo, Hernández had a long career in rowing for Cuba. He represented Cuba at the 2000, 2004 and 2008 Olympics, as a double sculls and quadruple sculls rower. In all of his Olympic events he was able to make it to the B Final. He won a total of ten Pan American Games medals during his career. At every games from 1999 to 2011 he won at least one medal, five of them golds. He was also a regular competitor at the World Rowing Championships, with his best placing coming at Lucerne in 2001, when he and Yosbel Martínez were fourth in the doubles sculls

References

External links
Yoennis Hernández at Sports Reference

1978 births
Living people
Cuban male rowers
Olympic rowers of Cuba
Rowers at the 2000 Summer Olympics
Rowers at the 2004 Summer Olympics
Rowers at the 2008 Summer Olympics
Pan American Games gold medalists for Cuba
Pan American Games silver medalists for Cuba
Pan American Games bronze medalists for Cuba
Pan American Games medalists in rowing
Sportspeople from Guantánamo
Rowers at the 1999 Pan American Games
Rowers at the 2003 Pan American Games
Rowers at the 2007 Pan American Games
Rowers at the 2011 Pan American Games
Medalists at the 1999 Pan American Games
Medalists at the 2003 Pan American Games
Medalists at the 2007 Pan American Games
Medalists at the 2011 Pan American Games
20th-century Cuban people
21st-century Cuban people